Fawnskin is an unincorporated community in San Bernardino County, California, United States.  Its altitude is 6,827 feet (2,081 m).  The community has a post office, which was established on May 18, 1918.

History
The small township was once an artists' colony, which attracted artisans, musicians, composers and actors from the Los Angeles area. Mountain travelers in the 19th century came to the Big Bear Valley through Fawnskin on the rough road by stagecoach and later motorcars. Several other names were temporarily chosen for the North Shore village including Bald Eagle Valley, Big Bear Village, Cline-Miller, Grout, and Oso Grande.

The village has always been an attraction to vacationers seeking a retreat from city life in its mountain terrain. Several hundred homes are in the forested mountainside adjacent to the forest.

Gold miners, loggers, and hunters were drawn to the adjacent Holcomb Valley during the 19th century. The Native American legend about how the town got its name has been turned into the urban legend. The Anglo version is that hunters discovered deer (fawn) skins stretched out to dry in the sun. Hence, the area became known as Fawn Skin and later Fawnskin.

Fawnskin was once the hub of lakeside activity, serving as a stagecoach stop and tourist attraction with hotels and dining. The town's main landmark is the Fawn Lodge, built in 1924, but now closed. Composer Fannie Charles Dillon founded Woodland Theater at Fawnskin, Big Bear Lake, California, in 1924 and served as its general manager from 1926 to 1929.

Other notable landmarks include the Pedersen Saw Mill, which lies just west of the lodge; and the historic post office, which lies to the east of the lodge but now is a private home rental. Downtown Fawnskin has some of the oldest buildings in the Big Bear valley.

Once popular for camping, the Lighthouse Camp and Landing is the only surviving north shore camp from the 1920s. Hanna Flats and YMCA Camp Whittle —owned and operated by the Metropolitan Los Angeles YMCA—are located within the forest above Fawnskin and remain favorites of vacationers.

Fawnskin events include the comic Doo Dah Parade and the Loggers’ Jubilee. The town also claims the only "honest" election in the nation. Anyone can vote for the Fawnskin Mayor; votes are donations of a quarter. The candidate who wins is the one who raises the most money. Hence, the town "buys" their politicians. The current mayor of Fawnskin is Billy Van Vugt, a former motocross racer and freestyle motocross athlete and one of the owners of The Outpost, a mountain-modern lodge and event space in Fawnskin. 

Today, Fawnskin is designated as a protective habitat for golden and American bald eagles. They return annually to the valley from November to April.

In 1998, the multimillion-dollar Big Bear Discovery Center was built and plans to expand. The facility is operated by a partnership between the US Forest Service and the San Bernardino National Forest Association.

Notable residents
A variety of celebrities live in the area. Two publishers operate out of Fawnskin and several writers live there full-time, including William Sarabande.

Jordan Romero, the 13-year-old boy who conquered Mount Everest, is also known as one of the Fawnskin Folks.

The Outpost, a mountain-modern lodge and event space in Fawnskin, is owned by Fawnskin mayor and former motocross athlete Billy Van Vugt; stuntwoman and former Nitro Circus athlete Jolene Van Vugt, the first woman to backflip a full-sized motorcycle; ESPN senior writer and broadcast journalist Alyssa Roenigk and New England restauranteurs Becky and Tim Clark.

Actress/singer Shirley Jones and her husband actor/comedian Marty Ingels also own a home in Fawnskin. Marty Ingels and Shirley Jones bought a piece of property in 2001 and created Fawn Park in downtown Fawnskin. However, it was closed to the public from July 2006 until it was reopened September 2011, featuring a memorial to those who died in the September 11 attacks. The small mountain resort community also has other parks which include the Old Miller School House Park, Dana Point Park, and the Don Conroy Memorial Park.

In popular culture
Fawnskin is a popular filming location and has been featured in the 1958 B-movie, Giant from the Unknown, Hallmark's Angel in the Family, Doctor Dolittle II, the 1999 Academy Award-nominated film The Insider, and others.

Many scenes of Columbo: Murder by the Book (1971) (with guest star Jack Cassidy, then married to Shirley Jones) were filmed here, as was a Perry Mason episode, "The Case of the Violent Village."

In chapter 35 of Stephen J. Cannell's novel, At First Sight (2008), the antagonist Chick Best and protagonist Paige Ellis stop in Fawnskin en route to the Bests' vacation cabin in Big Bear.

A 2003 episode of CSI: Crime Scene Investigation is set in Jackpot, Nevada, but the scenes were actually filmed in Fawnskin, which earned the community about $150,000 in revenue.

Media
The small town's news and informal activities have been reported in two publications, Fawnskin Folks (1920s) and the Fawnskin Flyer (Est. 2005).

See also 
 Big Bear Lake
 Big Bear Discovery Center

References

External links 
 Fawnskin Flyer
 Fawnskin Chamber of Commerce
 Fawnskin Fire Station 96
 Spectrum News 1: Fawnskin Mayoral Race 2022
 KCLA: Van Vugt stunt siblings own Fawnskin lodge

Unincorporated communities in San Bernardino County, California
Big Bear Valley
San Bernardino Mountains
San Bernardino National Forest
Unincorporated communities in California